Kachorra is an Argentinian family telenovela, produced by Telefe and RGB Entertainment in 2002, and protagonized by  Natalia Oreiro and Pablo Rago.

Production 
The story was devised by Natalia Oreiro herself. She proposed it to Gustavo Yankelevich (a shareholder of RGB Entertainment, the company that produces the show), who ended up producing the novela, with some changes.

Kachorra meant a big comeback for Natalia Oreiro, the queen of soap operas, to the television after two years when she devoted herself to promoting her second musical album.

Cast 
 Natalia Oreiro – Antonia "Kachorra" Guerrero / Rosario Achával.
 Pablo Rago – Bruno Moravia.
etc.

Awards

References

External links 
 Kachorra at Jump TV

2002 telenovelas
Telefe telenovelas
Comedy telenovelas
2002 Argentine television series debuts
2002 Argentine television series endings